KSAC may refer to:

 the ICAO code for Sacramento Executive Airport
 Kingston and St. Andrew Corporation, Jamaica
 KSAC-FM, a radio station in Sacramento
 KCVV, formerly KSAC-AM
 KKSU (AM), a former radio station in Manhattan, Kansas, USA that used the KSAC call from 1924 to 1984
 Potassium thioacetate (KSAc).